Panasonic Lumix DMC-GF3 is the eighth camera in Panasonic's Lumix G-series adhering to the Micro Four Thirds System (MFT) design standard, and was announced in June 2011.

The Panasonic DMC-GF3 uses a resistive touchscreen to provide mode selections, and as such that there is not a mode dial on the camera. Many features are no longer controlled by dials and buttons and wheels, but via the 3-inch touchscreen (460k- dot) at the rear of the unit.

At the time of introduction on 13 June 2011, the GF3 was the world's smallest and lightest digital interchangeable lens system camera.

The GF3 has received generally positive reviews for a small camera with a large sensor, and has speedy handling, including very fast auto focus, and good image quality. The camera was praised for its improvements in jpeg colour rendering and high iso over the previous Panasonic GF2 model but criticised the GF3 for its lack of external controls and hotshoe (preventing use of the Panasonic viewfinder or flash system) and the older 12MP sensor which is showing its age against the newer Panasonic sensors and the larger APS-C sensors used in the Sony NEX cameras.

The GF3 began shipping in late July 2011 and was configured in several kits  available with the Lumix G 14mm F2.5 lens (GF3C), the Lumix G 14-42mm F3.5-5.6 (GF3K), both the Lumix G 14mm F2.5 and 14-42mm F3.5-5.6 lenses (GF3W) or the Lumix G 14-42mm X PZ lens F3.5-5.6 (GF3X). The last letter of the product code identifies the GF3 body colour, available colours are Black (Code K), Pink (Code P), Red, (Code R), Brown (Code T) and White (Code W).

Features
The GF3 is one of the world's smallest and lightest interchangeable lens system cameras. Designed in accordance with the Micro Four Thirds (MFT) system design standard, the GF3 is capable of both still and High Definition video, and is able to use a wide variety of MFT lenses supplied by both Olympus and Panasonic, as well as other third party lenses which conform to the MFT system design standard. With certain of the system pancake lenses, the GF3 is small enough to fit into a pocket, and yet is capable of delivering images that rival lower end digital single lens reflex (DSLR) cameras that are much bulkier in both size and weight.

The GF3 boasts an upgraded processor, so that it can focus much faster than predecessor GF1 and GF2 models, even though it uses the same 12MP four thirds sensor. The GF3 focus and reaction time is on par with its more expensive Panasonic Lumix DMC-G3 sibling, but the GF3 cannot match the image quality of the newer, higher resolution 16MP G3 sensor, especially under low light conditions where higher ISO (greater than 800) speeds are used. However, even though the GF3 uses the older 12MP sensor the in camera JPEG processing has been improved for better colors and better high ISO performance when compared to the GF 2 and GF1 camera bodies. The GF3 puts small size at a premium, and when paired with a pancake lens made by either Panasonic or Olympus will make a particularly attractive purse or pocketable large sensor, interchangeable lens camera. Examples of such pancake type lenses would be the Panasonic Lumix 14mm f/2.5, the Olympus 17 mm f/2.8 or the Panasonic 20mm f/1.7 pancake lenses. The newly introduced Panasonic 14-42mm f/3.5-5.6 X series power zoom lens is a very compact zoom lens which in storage mode is only slightly larger than the Panasonic 20mm pancake.

Firmware updates

Panasonic Firmware releases 
Panasonic has announced the following firmware update

See also
 Olympus PEN E-P2
 Olympus PEN E-PL2
 Olympus PEN E-P3
 Olympus PEN E-PL3
 Panasonic Lumix DMC-GF1

Micro Four Thirds Camera introduction roadmap

References

External links

Panasonic Lumix DMC-GF3 Product site
Panasonic Lumix DMC-GF3 Press Release
Panasonic Lumix DMC-GF3 Review - dpreview.com
Panasonic Lumix DMC-GF3 Preview - cameralabs.com
Panasonic Lumix DMC-GF3 Review - imaging-resource.com
Panasonic Lumix DMC-GF3 Review - photographyblog.com
Panasonic Lumix DMC-GF3 Review - wikoshop.com

GF3